Michael Timothy Byrne (born October 17, 1986) is a former American football offensive lineman. He was signed by the Miami Dolphins as an undrafted free agent in 2008. He played college football at Delaware.

Professional career
Byrne also played in the Canadian Football League for the Calgary Stampeders and was a member of the Toronto Argonauts.

External links
Calgary Stampeders bio
Delaware Fightin' Blue Hens bio

1986 births
Living people
Sportspeople from Lancaster, Pennsylvania
Players of American football from Pennsylvania
American players of Canadian football
American football offensive tackles
American football offensive guards
American football centers
Canadian football offensive linemen
Delaware Fightin' Blue Hens football players
Miami Dolphins players
Calgary Stampeders players
Toronto Argonauts players
Pittsburgh Power players
Lehigh Valley Steelhawks players